Herbert Reese Weaver (January 13, 1932 – May 3, 2022) was an American professional golfer who played on the PGA Tour and the Senior PGA Tour. 

A native of Beaumont, Texas, Weaver played collegiate golf at Louisiana State University.

Weaver turned professional in 1956. He had second-place finishes at the 1961 Beaumont Open and the 1962 Carling Open before earning his first PGA Tour victory at the Jacksonville Open on March 21, 1965. The event was held at the Selva Marina Country club and was attended by 15,000 people. Weaver collected $8,500 for his efforts, and was the first male golfer from Beaumont to win a PGA Tour event. He was in the top 100 money winners upon retiring in 1968.

Weaver played on the Senior PGA Tour from 1982 to 1984. His best finishes were a pair of T-6 at the 1983 Marlboro Classic and the 1984 du Maurier Champions. In the late 1990s, Weaver worked as an official on the Senior PGA Tour.

Professional wins (5)

PGA Tour wins (1)

Other wins (4)
1967 Panama Open
1968 Caracas Open
1971 Ford Maracaibo Open
1975 Tennessee PGA Championship

References

External links

American male golfers
LSU Tigers golfers
PGA Tour golfers
PGA Tour Champions golfers
Golfers from Texas
Sportspeople from Beaumont, Texas
1932 births
2022 deaths